In literature, a pseudotranslation is a text written as if it had been translated from a foreign language, even though no foreign language original exists.

History
The practice of writing works which falsely claimed to be translations began in medieval chivalric romance. It was common in 16th-century Spain, where Amadís de Gaula and the numerous works descended from it benefited from the invention of printing to offer fantasies of travel, war, and love to wealthy young adults. The most successful of the Spanish works were quickly translated into all the major languages of Western Europe.  Cervantes wrote the 1605 Don Quixote to finish them off (he succeeded) because he believed that false history was socially harmful, as one of his characters explains in Chapter 49.

The concept of a pseudotranslation was reinvented by Israeli scholar Gideon Toury in Descriptive Translation Studies–and Beyond (1995). The technique allows authors to provide more insight into the culture of the work's setting by presupposing that the reader is unfamiliar with the work's cultural setting, opening the work to a wider world audience.

Writing a pseudotranslation involves using features that usually indicate to a reader that the text is a translation. As some translators have argued, pseudotranslations can be a way of publishing literature that is stylistically different or critical." Scholars such as Gideon Toury also note that readers are more likely to accept texts that differ from the norm if they are culturally distant.

Many works of science fiction and fantasy can be regarded as pseudotranslations from nonexistent languages. J. R. R. Tolkien's The Lord of the Rings explicitly claims to have been translated from the ancient languages of Middle-earth, while Gene Wolfe, in the afterword to its first volume, claims that The Book of the New Sun series is translated "from a language that has yet to achieve existence".

Examples

History of the Kings of Britain (c. 1136), by Geoffrey of Monmouth
Don Quixote (1605), by Miguel de Cervantes
Persian Letters (1721), by Montesquieu
Cleveland (1731), by Abbé Prévost
 Candide (1759), by Voltaire
 The Works of Ossian (1765) by James Macpherson
La Guzla, ou Choix de Poesies Illyriques recueillies dans la Dalmatie, la Croatie et l'Herzegowine (1827), by Prosper Mérimée
Le Livre de Jade (1867), by Judith Gautier
The Kasîdah of Hâjî Abdû El-Yezdî (1880), by Richard Francis Burton
The Songs of Bilitis (1894), by Piere Louÿs
The Man Who Counted (1938), by Júlio César de Mello e Souza
La Fille d’un héros de l’Union soviétique (1990), by Andreï Makine
The Beijing of Possibilities (2009), by Jonathan Tel
I Am China (2014), by Xiaolu Guo
 Samen zullen we slapen voor het sterven (2015), by Bavo Dhooge
 P. Mil. (2017), by Jacob Eisenmann
 Always Coming Home (1985), by Ursula Kroeber Le Guin

See also
 Translation

References

 Further reading (most recent first)
 Kupsch-Losereit, Sigrid (2014) "Pseudotranslations in 18th century France". In: Transfiction. Research into the realities of translation fiction. Eds. Klaus Kaindl/ Karlheinz Spitzl. Amsterdam: Benjamins, pp. 189–202.
 Gürçağlar, Şehnaz Tahir. (2010). "Scouting the Borders of Translation: Pseudotranslation, Concealed Translations and Authorship in Twentieth-Century Turkey," Translation Studies, Vol. 3, No. 2, pp. 172–187. 
 McCall, Ian. (2006). "Translating the Pseudotranslated: Andreï Makine's La Fille d'un héros de l'Union soviétique," Forum for Modern Language Studies, Vol. 42, No. 3, pp. 287–297.
 Rambelli, Paolo. (2006) "Pseudotranslations, Authorship and Novelists in Eighteenth-Century Italy." In Translating Others.'' Ed. Theo Hermans. Manchester, UK: St. Jerome Publishing, pp. 181–193.
 

Comparative literature
Translation
Literary genres